Svetlana Rudalova (born 3 November 1984 in Kremenchuk) is a Belarusian individual rhythmic gymnast.

Rudalova made her international debut in 2002, and appeared at the 2004 Olympic Games, where she placed 10th in the all-around contest.

References

1984 births
Living people
Belarusian rhythmic gymnasts
Gymnasts at the 2004 Summer Olympics
Olympic gymnasts of Belarus
Gymnasts from Minsk
Medalists at the Rhythmic Gymnastics World Championships
Medalists at the Rhythmic Gymnastics European Championships